Svetlana Mikhailovna Chimrova (born 15 April 1996) is a Russian swimmer. She competed in the women's 100 metre butterfly event at the 2016 Summer Olympics. In 2020, Chimrova took part in the International Swimming League as a member of the US-based team New York Breakers.

References

External links
 

1996 births
Living people
Russian female freestyle swimmers
Russian female butterfly swimmers
Olympic swimmers of Russia
Swimmers at the 2016 Summer Olympics
Swimmers at the 2020 Summer Olympics
Universiade medalists in swimming
Place of birth missing (living people)
World Aquatics Championships medalists in swimming
European Aquatics Championships medalists in swimming
European Championships (multi-sport event) silver medalists
Universiade silver medalists for Russia
Medalists at the 2015 Summer Universiade